The Australian Republic Movement (ARM) is a non-partisan organisation campaigning for Australia to become a republic. ARM and its supporters have promoted various models of a republic including parliamentary republic and it is, again, reviewing its preferred model.

As of 2017, ARM operated staffed campaign offices in Sydney and Canberra, and has branches active in all states and territories.

Australia’s current head of state

Australia has a common head of state with all the other Commonwealth realm nations.  Australia’s constitution provided that, in 1901, the then monarch of the United Kingdom also became the monarch of Australia. The nations and their governments are independent with only a personal union in the person of the monarch.
The Australian monarch is generally understood to be the head of state, although regal functions are ordinarily performed by an appointed governor-general and state governors.

Chairs

History

Foundation
The ARM was founded on 7 July 1991 and was originally known as the Australian Republican Movement. Its first chairman was novelist Thomas Keneally, with other founding members including lawyer Malcolm Turnbull, later Prime Minister, former Australian cricket captain Ian Chappell, film director Fred Schepisi, and author, journalist, and radio and television presenter Peter FitzSimons. It is currently headed by Australian retired soccer player, human rights activist Craig Foster.

1999 referendum

The Australian republic referendum, held on 6 November 1999, was a two-question referendum to amend the Constitution of Australia. For some years opinion polls had suggested that a majority of the electorate favoured a republic. Nonetheless, the republic referendum was narrowly defeated due to a range of factors, including a lack of bi-partisanship and division among republicans on the method proposed for selection of the president.

Policy
The ARM is undertaking a national consultation to seek the views of Australians about the substance of the constitutional reforms needed for Australia to have its constitutional independence from the British Monarchy. Once completed, the consultation will inform the ARM's decision about which model it should advocate to be taken forward to a referendum.

A referendum would give voters the choice between retaining the British Monarchy as the head of Australia, and Australia having its constitutional independence.

Australian Choice Model
The ARM announced their proposed model for a republic on 13 January 2022, the Australian Choice Model. The model would entail a process where the State and Territory Parliaments each nominate one candidate to be the Head of State, and the Federal Parliament nominates up to three candidates. The list of these candidates would then be put to a vote where the public would elect their preferred candidate and would serve for a five-year term. A majority of ARM members voted to support the policy, however the policy announcement raised concerns and criticisms from the Australian Monarchist League, as well as other republicans, including former Prime Minister Paul Keating and former New South Wales Premier Bob Carr. Critics such as Carr claim that a head of state who is elected by the public could cause conflict with a Prime Minister and Parliament. Past ARM Chair Peter FitzSimons dismissed these criticisms, claiming that a head of state's powers would be limited and would be unable to dismiss a Prime Minister.

Arguments
The ARM argues that Australia should replace the monarchy with an Australian as president and head of state. It contends that “the benefits of this system are a head of state that can exclusively represent Australian interests, a system that better aligns with democratic institutions, a fully independent constitution and a head of state that can represent Australian values.”

Notable supporters
 Peter FitzSimons
 Joe Hockey
 Alan Joyce
 Ted Smout
 Malcolm Turnbull

See also

 Republicanism in Australia
 1999 Australian republic referendum
 Ausflag
 Australian Constitutional history
 Commonwealth of Nations
 Commonwealth realm
 Culture of Australia
 Statute of Westminster Adoption Act 1942

References

External links
Australian Republic Movement website

Organizations established in 1991
Republicanism in Australia
Republican organizations
1991 establishments in Australia